Sarah Raymond (born 8 October 1969) is the former captain of Australia women's national association football team.

Cooper played more than 50 matches for her country and represented Australia at the 1995 and 1999 FIFA Women's World Cup.

In popular culture
Cooper posed nude with some of her teammates in the controversial "The Matildas: the new fashion in football: 2000 Olympic year calendar" in an effort to increase visibility of the team and raise money for their Olympic Games preparation. A royalty from the sale of each calendar was used to support the team's 2000 Summer Olympic Games preparation.

References

External links
 Clarkson profile

Living people
1969 births
Australian women's soccer players
1995 FIFA Women's World Cup players
1999 FIFA Women's World Cup players
Australia women's international soccer players
Place of birth missing (living people)
Women's association football defenders